Twelvefour (marketed as twelvefour) is the second album by Australian band The Paper Kites, released on 28 August 2015 by Wonderlick Entertainment and Sony Music Australia. The album's release was preceded by lead single "Electric Indigo", released on 19 June 2015. Its video, directed by Matthew J Cox, was released on 13 July. The second single, "Revelator Eyes", followed in September with a video directed by Dan Huiting. "Renegade", the third single, was released along with a video in April 2016.

The album was written entirely between the hours of midnight and 4 a.m. due to the creativity lead singer and songwriter Sam Bentley felt arise during this time. For this reason, it has been referred to as a concept album. The album was then recorded in Seattle with American producer Phil Ek over six weeks in March and April 2015. The band chose Ek to create a more upbeat sound compared to their previous releases, incorporating electric guitars and synthesizers into their music.

twelvefour debuted at number 8 on the Australian ARIA Albums Chart on 5 September 2015. The band embarked on a tour of Australia from 16 October to 8 November 2015 in support of the album. They then toured the United States and Canada across November and December 2015, and Europe in January and February 2016. A film directed by Cox depicting the process of making the album was announced for release later in 2015, but has yet to surface.

Critical reception

Gareth Hipwell of Rolling Stone Australia gave the album three out of five stars and felt "Revelator Eyes" sounded as if "The muses of the witching hour [...] have breathed some hazy Eighties nostalgia" into Bentley's songwriting. However, Hipwell criticised his often "insubstantial lyrics". The AU Review called the album a "fluid progression of sounds and ideas" as well as "[h]ypnotic, whimsical and otherworldly". Jessica Morris of the US-based website PPcorn deemed the album "[c]omplex and delicate" as well as "profound".

Michael Smith of Renowned for Sound gave the album a perfect score of 5 out of 5 stars, opining that the change to an upbeat style was a "logical evolution" of the band's sound, and commended "Bentley's consistently moving vocals to the sheer quality of the guitar riffs that give the songs their power". Sara Tamim of Vulture Magazine was "fabulously yet not surprisingly impressed" by the band's second album; she also remarked positively on the interchange of styles and the "new, flurry sound with intergalactic guitar vibes" of opening track "Electric Indigo".

In a 4 out of 5 stars review, Roshan Clarke of The Music labelled the album a "gorgeous listening experience" and expressed that the "glowing album cover and moody track names like 'Electric Indigo' reflect th[e] nocturnal theme [of the record], but the warm instrumentation transcends any particular time of day". Writing for News.com.au, Mikey Cahill judged that the album is primarily devoid of egos—"what you hear is what you get". Rating the album 3 out of 5 stars, Cahill went on to state that the band sound "calm and delirious" on "Bleed Confusion" and that "Woke Up from a Dream" is "timeless Americana".

Track listing

Personnel
Credits adapted from album liner notes.

The Paper Kites
 Josh Bentley – drums, percussion
 Sam Bentley – lead vocals, electric and acoustic guitars, harmonica, keyboards, writing and design
 Christina Lacy – harmony vocals, guitars
 David Powys – backing vocals, banjo, lap steel
 Sam Rasmussen – bass guitar, synthesizer

Technical personnel
 Greg Calbi – mastering
 Phil Ek – engineering, mixing and production
 Cameron Nicklaus – assistant engineer

Artwork
 Mark Bentley – design for twelvefour sign
 Jackson Grant – photography
 Jefferton James – artwork editing, design and layout

Charts

References

2015 albums
The Paper Kites albums
Sony Music Australia albums
Nettwerk Records albums